is a Japanese judoka.

She competed at the 2013 World Judo Championships in Rio de Janeiro, where she reached the semifinal and finished fifth, and she was part of the Japanese team that won gold medals in the team competition.

She married judoka Masashi Ebinuma in 2014.

References

External links
 

1988 births
Living people
Japanese female judoka
Asian Games medalists in judo
Judoka at the 2014 Asian Games
Asian Games gold medalists for Japan
Asian Games bronze medalists for Japan
Medalists at the 2014 Asian Games
21st-century Japanese women